En-ghe (Ҥ ҥ; italics: Ҥ ҥ) is a letter of the Cyrillic script used only in non-Slavic languages. The shape of the letter originated as a ligature of the Cyrillic letters en (Н н) and ghe (Г г), but en-ghe is used as a separate letter in alphabets.

It represents the velar nasal , like the pronunciation of 〈ng〉 in "sing".

Ҥ is romanized using Ṅ, Ng, or even Ŋ.

En-ghe is used in the alphabets of the Aleut, Altai, Meadow Mari, and Yakut languages.

In certain Old Slavonic manuscripts, a character of the same shape could be used to represent palatalized , a role similar to modern Serbian/Macedonian letter nje (Њ њ). These manuscripts also may contain similarly built characters for palatalized Д, З, Л and Р.

Computing codes

Related letters and other similar characters
 Ң ң : Cyrillic letter en with descender
 Ӈ ӈ : Cyrillic letter en with hook
 Ŋ ŋ : Latin letter eng
 Ꞑ ꞑ : Latin letter n with descender
𝆦: Hauptstimme

Cyrillic ligatures